A luxury car is a car that provides increased levels of comfort, equipment, amenities, quality, performance, and associated status compared to moderately priced cars.

The term is subjective and reflects both the qualities of a car and the brand image of its manufacturer. Luxury brands rank above premium brands, though there is no fixed demarcation between the two.

Traditionally, most luxury cars were large vehicles, though smaller sports-oriented models were always produced. "Compact" luxury vehicles such as hatchbacks, and off-road capable sport utility vehicles, are relatively modern trends.

Classification standards 

Several car classification schemes include a luxury category, such as:
 Australia: Since the year 2000, the Federal Government's luxury car tax applies to new vehicles over a certain purchase price, with higher thresholds applying for cars considered as fuel efficient. As of 2019, the thresholds were approximately AU$66,000 (US$,000) for normal cars and AU$76,000 (US$,000) for fuel-efficient cars.
 Europe: Luxury cars are classified as F-segment vehicles in the European Commission classification scheme.
 Italy: The term "auto di lusso" is used for luxury cars.
 France: The term "voiture de luxe" is used for luxury cars.
 Germany: The term  (upper class) is used for luxury cars.
 Russia: The term ( ("representative class vehicle, also translated as luxury vehicle) is used for luxury cars.
 Rental cars: The ACRISS Car Classification Code is a system used by many car rental companies to define equivalent vehicles across brands. This system includes "Luxury" and "Luxury Elite" categories (along with "Premium" and "Premium Elite" categories). The criteria for a vehicle to be considered "luxury" is not published.

Characteristics

Features
Luxury cars have traditionally emphasized higher levels of comfort and safety. Manufacturers often introduce new safety technologies and comfort amenities on luxury models before they are available on more affordable models. Some brands, like Audi and BMW have expanded their marketing by "introducing lesser priced and strip-down economy versions of their products."

Luxury vehicles can be a status symbol for conspicuous consumption. However, since many European luxury car buyers shy away from conspicuous consumption, brands offer buyers the option of removing exterior badges that identify the model name or engine size.

The suspension system of most luxury cars is tuned to prioritize ride quality over handling, however, some cars are marketed as "sports luxury" and have a greater emphasis on handling characteristics.

Layout and powertrain

Traditionally, luxury cars have used a front-engine, rear-wheel drive (FR) layout. The FR layout is more expensive to produce and produces lower fuel economy than a front-wheel drive layout, however, it allows for larger engines (particularly straight-six, V8, and V12) to be used.

Some American luxury cars during the 1970s through the 1990s switched to a front-wheel drive layout with transverse engine, due to the Arab Oil Embargo of 1973 and the 1979 fuel crises which eliminated many FR platforms in favor of the more economical front-wheel drive (FF) layout. From the early 2000s, several of these American luxury cars reverted to FR layouts.

Since the introduction of the Bentley Continental GT in 2003, additional luxury cars feature all-wheel drive.

History

European manufacturers 

Prior to World War II, a wide array of European producers made luxury cars, including Rolls-Royce, Bugatti, Delage, Delahaye, Talbot-Lago, Bentley, Alvis, Avions Voisin, Isotta Fraschini, Horch, Simson, Stoewer, Maybach, Mercedes-Benz, Hispano Suiza, Daimler Company, and Spyker.

France was a leading producer of powerful luxury automobiles prior to World War II. After World War II, the French government used puissance fiscale tax regulations to encourage manufacturers to build cars with small engines, and French motorists to buy them. The Maserati-powered Citroën SM and the Citroën C6 were arguably the last domestic French luxury cars. In the 2010s, some French manufacturers have attempted to develop luxury cars, however the lack of a historical legacy has hindered these efforts. In 2014, Citroën introduced DS Automobiles sub-brand to market luxury cars.

Pre World War II intermediate car manufacturers like Renault, Fiat, Opel, Lancia, Škoda, Riley, Praga, Peugeot, Hillman, Tatra made luxury cars but were forced to make economy cars and superminis post World War II. Following World War II, Germany rose to become an export powerhouse, building on success with the Mercedes-Benz brand, later joined by BMW, which acquired Rolls-Royce Motor Cars, as well as Volkswagen that controls Audi, Porsche, Bentley, Lamborghini, and Bugatti brands.

In the Soviet Union, the manufacturer ZiL (then called Zis) began producing representational limousines in the mid-1930s. In the early 1950s GAZ joined with the somewhat smaller "Chaika" model range.

North American manufacturers

The luxury car phenomenon began at the start of the automobile industry when the wealthy frequently invested in the manufacture of such models to gain the social prestige associated thereby. Emphasis was also placed on custom-built coachwork. The 1920s and 1930s were the apogee of production of these very large luxury automobiles from many manufacturers. The significant North American manufacturers from 1910-1940 were Auburn, Buick, Cadillac, Chrysler, Continental, Cord, Daniels, DeSoto, Duesenberg, Franklin, Imperial, LaFayette, LaSalle, Lincoln, Marmon, Packard, Peerless, Pierce Arrow, Ruxton, Stearns-Knight, and Stutz. The Great Depression put many luxury car manufacturers out of business; others would hold on before going defunct during the postwar era.

From 1946 until the late 1990s, Cadillac was the top-selling brand of luxury cars in the U.S., while Lincoln was second. The most successful and long-running model names during this era were the Cadillac DeVille, Lincoln Continental, and the Chrysler Imperial. The Lincoln Mark Series and Cadillac Eldorado were positioned in the personal luxury category and competition between them continued into the 1990s.

The personal luxury car emerged into mass popularity and affordability as an America-specific category of popularly-priced cars made from the 1950s by the four domestic manufacturers (GM, Ford, Chrysler, and AMC) that reached peak popularity in the 1970s. The cars were stylized, mass-produced two-door coupés or convertibles, relying on standard components. These distinctively styled cars were targeting the needs of individual customers, not an entire family. The longest running model lines were the 1958-1997 Ford Thunderbird, 1956-1998 Lincoln Mark Series, and the 1967-2002 Cadillac Eldorado.

In 1990, American luxury brands dominated with Cadillac selling over a quarter-million cars and Lincoln had its best year ever at 231,660 units. However, the market was changing with an ever greater acceptance of smaller, more efficient imported luxury brands while at the same time, the domestic manufacturers were downsizing their models with product decisions that backfired on quality and brand respect.

Since the late 1990s, Japanese and German brands have sold the most luxury-type cars in the United States. However, the Cadillac Escalade has led the luxury SUV segment sales in the United States since its introduction in 1998, with the highest sales for 15 out of its first 20 years on the market.

In the 2000s, both Ford and General Motors produced luxury pickups: the 2002-2013 Cadillac Escalade EXT, 2002-2003 Lincoln Blackwood, and 2006-2014 Lincoln Mark LT.
In the late 2000s, the Cadillac CTS and Cadillac DTS led to a resurgence in the brand's luxury sedans. The equivalent sedan from the Ford group, the 2008 Lincoln MKS, was also regarded as a significant improvement over previous models. In 2010, BMW was the best-selling luxury vehicle manufacturer by sales, with Audi and Mercedes-Benz the second and third highest selling luxury brands.

East Asian manufacturers 

Chinese manufacturer Hongqi was launched in 1958, making it the oldest Chinese luxury car marque. Later newcomers joined taking advantage of the rise of electric powertrains, with NEV brands such as Nio in 2014, Li Auto in 2015, HiPhi in 2019, and BYD in 2020 producing luxury electric and hybrid vehicles.

Japanese manufacturers have been producing luxury cars since the 1950s, including the Toyota Crown (1955–present), Prince/Nissan Gloria (1959–2004), Nissan Cedric (1960–2015), Mitsubishi Debonair (1964–1998), Nissan President (1965–2010), Toyota Century (1967–present), Mazda Luce/929 (1969–1991), and Honda Legend (1985–present).

Since the 1980s, overseas sales of Japanese luxury cars have increased, challenging traditional European luxury brands.

Several East Asian manufacturers have created sub-brands for the marketing of luxury cars. The first of these was the 1986 launch of Acura (a Honda sub-brand), followed by Lexus (Toyota) in 1989, Infiniti (Nissan) in 1989, and Genesis (Hyundai) in 2015.

Global financial crisis 
The late-2000s global financial crisis was the first time since the Great Depression of the 1930s that the luxury car market suffered considerably, something not seen in previous economic downturns. Many such customers saw their net worth decline following the collapse in financial markets and real-estate values. For example, some of the steepest drop-offs came at the high end, including the BMW 7 Series and Rolls-Royce Phantom, and in 2010 Mercedes-Benz dropped the price of the W212 E-Class. The unusually sharp decline in luxury car sales has led observers to believe that there is a fundamental shift and reshaping of the luxury automotive market, with one industry official suggesting that the marques no longer command the premiums that they used to, and another saying that conspicuous consumption was no longer attractive in poor economic conditions. Additionally, mainstream brands have been able to offer amenities and devices such as leather, wood, and anti-lock brakes, previously found only on luxury cars, as the costs decline.

However, luxury vehicle sales did not collapse as much as their non-luxury counterparts. This was aided by growing interest in luxury vehicles from emerging markets such as China and Russia.

Sales in the entry-level luxury segment remained strong throughout the GFC, due to prices being lowered to compete with well-equipped non-luxury cars. For example, in Canada, several luxury manufacturers set sales records in August 2009, due mostly to discounted pricing on entry-level luxury vehicles.

Brands 

Some auto manufacturers market their luxury models using the same marque as the rest of their line. Others have created a separate marque (e.g. Lexus, launched by Toyota in 1989) or purchased one (e.g. Bentley, by Volkswagen in 1998). 

Occasionally, a luxury car is initially sold under a mainstream marque and is later rebranded under a specific luxury marque (for example the Hyundai's Genesis to Genesis G80 as well as the Citroën DS to DS 5).

For mass-produced luxury cars, sharing of platforms or components with other models is common, as per modern automotive industry practice.

Market categories

Premium compact / Subcompact executive 

The premium compact class is the category of the smallest luxury cars. It became popular in the mid-2000s, when European manufacturers (such as Audi, Volvo, BMW, and Mercedes-Benz) introduced new entry-level models that were smaller and cheaper than their compact executive models. The premium compact cars are usually based on the platform of a compact car (also known as "small family car" or C-segment), while some models may be based on a subcompact car (also known as supermini or B-segment).

Examples include the Mercedes-Benz A-Class and CLA-Class, Audi A3, Volvo S40, BMW 1 Series, and 2 Series. Premium compacts compete with well-equipped mid-size cars, and highly optioned premium compact cars can have pricing and features that overlap models in the compact executive segment.

Compact executive / compact luxury 

A compact executive car or a compact luxury car is a premium car larger than a premium compact and smaller than an executive car. In European classification, compact executive cars are part of the D-segment. In North American terms, close equivalents are "compact premium car", "compact luxury car", "entry-level luxury car" and "near-luxury car". Compact executive cars are usually based on the platform of a mid-size car (also known as large family car or D-segment), while some models may be based on a compact car (also known as small family car or C-segment).

Executive / mid-size luxury 

Executive car is a British term for an automobile larger than a large family car. In official use, the term is adopted by Euro NCAP, a European organization founded to test for car safety. It is a passenger car classification defined by the European Commission.

Luxury saloon / full-size luxury sedan 

The next category of luxury cars is known in Great Britain as a "luxury saloon" or "luxury limousine," and is known in the United States as a full-size luxury sedan, large luxury sedan, or flagship sedan. It is the equivalent of the European F-segment and the German Oberklasse segment.

Many of these luxury saloons are the flagship for the marque and include the newest automotive technology. Several models are available in long-wheelbase versions, which provide additional rear legroom and may have a higher level of standard features.

Examples of luxury saloons / full-size luxury sedans include the BMW 7 Series, Jaguar XJ, Cadillac CT6, Genesis G90, Audi A8, Mercedes-Benz S-Class, Lexus LS, Porsche Panamera and Maserati Quattroporte.

Ultra-luxury 
Examples include the Rolls-Royce Phantom, Maybach 57 and 62, Hongqi L5, Bentley Mulsanne, Toyota Century, and Aurus Senat. The history of a brand and the exclusivity of a particular model can result in price premiums compared to luxury cars with similar features from less prestigious manufacturers. Ultra-luxury cars are usually selected as the official state car.

Grand tourer

Luxury SUV/Crossover
Long before the luxury SUV segment was defined and became popular, the 1966 Jeep Super Wagoneer was marketed at the time as a fully equipped station wagon. It was the first off-road SUV to offer a V8 engine and automatic transmission along with luxury car trim and equipment. Standard features included bucket seating, a center console, air conditioning, a seven-position tilt steering wheel, a vinyl roof, and gold-colored trim panels on the body sides and tailgate. By the late 1970s, optional equipment included an electric sunroof. The 1978 Jeep Wagoneer Limited was the spiritual successor to the Super Wagoneer and was the first four-wheel drive car to use leather upholstery.

The Range Rover was released in 1970 as a two-door vehicle for off-road durability with few "creature comforts." A four-door version was added in 1981, and the model was pushed upmarket in 1983 by introducing an automatic transmission (Chrysler's A727 TorqueFlite) as an option. The Range Rover had a long-travel coil-spring suspension and an aluminium V8 engine. 

In the mid-1990s, the SUV market expanded with new entrants. By the mid-1990s, the entry-level Ford Explorer and upscale Jeep Grand Cherokee were the market leaders for SUVs. The fastest-growing sector of this market was for the so-called luxury SUVs, which included the Jeep Grand Cherokee ... the Grand Cherokee's allure: "This vehicle is proof you can have a true off-road vehicle without giving up luxuries and amenities" with the Jeep providing a crucial new intangible factor for buyers—image.

The SUV models generated higher profit margins than passenger cars, and car manufacturers began introducing new luxury SUVs during the late 1990s. SUVs such as the 1995 Lexus LX, 1997 Mercedes-Benz M-Class, and 1998 Lincoln Navigator were the first SUVs produced by these luxury car brands. Some of these early luxury SUV models used unibody construction, becoming part of the trend moving away from the body-on-frame construction traditionally used by off-road vehicles.

During the mid-2000s, SUVs from luxury car brands grew by almost 40% in the United States to more than 430,000 vehicles (excluding SUV-only brands like Hummer and Land Rover), at a time when luxury car sales suffered a 1% decline, and non-luxury SUV sales were flat. By 2004, 30% of major luxury brands' U.S. sales were SUVs. Crossover SUVs became increasingly popular in the mid-2000s, and manufacturers also began to produce luxury versions of crossovers. The Lexus RX was the earliest luxury crossover on the market, and it has since been the best-selling luxury vehicle in the US. Some luxury crossovers are built on a platform shared with sedans or hatchbacks. For example, the Infiniti FX is based upon the same platform as the Infiniti G35 sedans and coupes. While early luxury crossovers released in the late 1990s have resembled traditional boxy SUVs, later crossovers, such as the Infiniti FX and BMW X6, have been designed with a sporting appearance.

Despite the increased popularity of crossover models, traditional luxury SUVs remain in production. Examples include the Lexus LX, Infiniti QX80, and Lincoln Navigator.

Research data from the mid-2000s suggested that luxury SUV buyers did not consider traditional luxury cars (e.g. sedans and coupes), therefore the SUV is becoming the key to bringing new customers into luxury dealerships.

Luxury car companies have increasingly introduced SUV or crossover models in the 2010s. For example, Rolls-Royce Cullinan, Bentley Bentayga, Aston Martin DBX, Maserati Levante, and Lamborghini Urus. Ferrari has announced that they will release an SUV model Ferrari Purosangue in 2023. Some brands, such as Lincoln, have even moved to an all SUV and/or crossover lineup.

See also
 Car classification
 Luxury goods

References

 
Car classifications